Fernando Gil Kreling (born 13 January 1996) is a Brazilian professional volleyball player. He is a member of the Brazil national team, a participant in the Olympic Games Tokyo 2020 and the 2019 World Cup winner. At the professional club level, he plays for Vero Volley Monza.

Honours

Clubs
 FIVB Club World Championship
  Betim 2015 – with Sada Cruzeiro
  Betim 2016 – with Sada Cruzeiro
  Betim 2019 – with Sada Cruzeiro
  Betim 2021 – with Sada Cruzeiro

 CSV South American Club Championship
  Taubate 2016 – with Sada Cruzeiro
  Montes Claros 2017 – with Sada Cruzeiro
  Montes Claros 2018 – with Sada Cruzeiro
  Belo Horizonte 2019 – with Sada Cruzeiro
  Contagem 2020 – with Sada Cruzeiro

 National championships
 2015/2016  Brazilian SuperCup, with Sada Cruzeiro
 2015/2016  Brazilian Cup, with Sada Cruzeiro
 2015/2016  Brazilian Championship, with Sada Cruzeiro
 2016/2017  Brazilian SuperCup, with Sada Cruzeiro
 2016/2017  Brazilian Championship, with Sada Cruzeiro
 2017/2018  Brazilian SuperCup, with Sada Cruzeiro
 2017/2018  Brazilian Cup, with Sada Cruzeiro
 2017/2018  Brazilian Championship, with Sada Cruzeiro
 2018/2019  Brazilian Cup, with Sada Cruzeiro
 2019/2020  Brazilian Cup, with Sada Cruzeiro
 2020/2021  Brazilian Cup, with Sada Cruzeiro

Youth national team
 2011  CSV U17 South American Championship
 2012  CSV U19 South American Championship
 2013  FIVB U23 World Championship
 2014  CSV U21 South American Championship
 2014  CSV U23 South American Championship
 2015  U21 Pan American Cup
 2016  CSV U23 South American Championship

Individual awards
 2011: CSV U17 South American Championship – Best Setter
 2012: CSV U19 South American Championship – Best Setter
 2014: CSV U21 South American Championship – Best Setter
 2016: CSV U23 South American Championship – Best Setter
 2020: CSV South American Club Championship – Most Valuable Player

References

External links
 Player profile at LegaVolley.it  
 
 
 Player profile at Volleybox.net

1996 births
Living people
People from Caxias do Sul
Sportspeople from Rio Grande do Sul
Brazilian men's volleyball players
Olympic volleyball players of Brazil
Volleyball players at the 2020 Summer Olympics
Brazilian expatriate sportspeople in Italy
Expatriate volleyball players in Italy
Setters (volleyball)